Support may refer to:

Arts, entertainment, and media 
 Supporting character
 Support (art), a solid surface upon which a painting is executed

Business and finance 
 Support (technical analysis)
 Child support
 Customer support
 Income Support

Construction 
 Support (structure), or lateral support, a type of structural support to help prevent sideways movement
 Structural support, architectural components that include arches, beams, columns, balconies, and stretchers

Law and politics 
 Advocacy, in politics, support for constituencies, issues, or legislation
 Lateral and subjacent support, a legal term

Mathematics

Mathematics (generally) 
 Support (mathematics), subset of the domain of a function where it is non-zero valued
 Support (measure theory), a subset of a measurable space
 Supporting hyperplane, sometimes referred to as support
 Support of a module, a set of prime ideals in commutative algebra

Statistics 
 Support, the natural logarithm of the likelihood ratio, as used in phylogenetics
 Method of support, in statistics, a technique that is used to make inferences from datasets
 Support of a distribution where the probability or probability density is positive

Military 
 Close air support
 Combat service support
 Combat support
 Fire support

Psychology 
 Moral support
 Peer support
 Social support
 Support group
 Sympathy

Science and technology 
 Catalyst support, in chemistry and materials science
 Life support, in medicine
 Technical support, help for computer hardware, software, or electronic goods

See also 
 Support vessel (disambiguation)